The Port Vila FA Cup or the PVFA Cup for short, is a cup in the country of Vanuatu, held for association football clubs competing in the Port Vila Football League It is run and overseen by the Port Vila Football Association. 

It was originally a tournament held as a pre-season competition for the 8 teams that play in the Digicel Premier League. As of 2016, the PVFA Cup became a tournament for all of the 27 teams across the 3 divisions. In 2019 we have three cups running at the same time, one for each division of Port Vila Football League 
Premier League Cup played by the 8 teams from Port Vila Premier League
First Division Cup played by the 8 teams from Port Vila First Division (second tier)
Second Division Cup played by the 8 teams from Port Vila Second Division (third tier)

Premier League Cup - 2019 Edition

Group A

Group B

Semi-finals

Final

Winners 

 2014 - Tafea 3-0 Ifira Black Bird

 2016 - Tupuji Imere 1-0 Erakor Golden Star

 2018 - Amicale 4-1 Galaxy

See also

Port Vila Shield
VFF National Super League
 Sport in Vanuatu

References 

Football competitions in Vanuatu